Taskforce for Interrogation Cell, also known as TFI Cell, is a Bangladesh government special interrogation cell operated by Bangladesh's intelligence forces (Directorate General of Forces Intelligence) and special police units (Rapid Action Battalion). It is located inside Rapid Action Battalion headquarters in Uttara, Dhaka. The Guardian described it as Bangladesh's most notorious torture cell. The other interrogation cell is called Joint Interrogation Cell.

History 
According to The Guardian the Taskforce for Interrogation Cell uses various forms of torture to interrogate suspects, including British citizens suspected of being terrorists. The Taskforce has coordinated interrogation activities with MI5 and MI6 of Britain when interrogating British-Bangladesh suspects.

During the 2006–2008 Bangladeshi political crisis, the Task Force Interrogation provided information on corruption by politicians to Bangladesh news organisations, such as The Daily Star. The editor of The Daily Star expressed regret over using information provided by the cell.

Brigadier General (retired) Abdur Rahim, former Director General of National Security Intelligence, was interrogated at the Taskforce for Interrogation Cell after his arrest in the 2004 arms and ammunition haul in Chittagong case in 2009.

In 2012, a special committee of the Parliament of Bangladesh recommended the closure of Taskforce for Interrogation Cell and recommended restricting the involvement of Directorate General of Forces Intelligence in national politics.

Temporary branch 
After the Bangladesh Rifles mutiny in February 2009, a temporary Taskforce for Interrogation Cell was established inside the headquarters of Bangladesh Rifles in Pilkhana, Dhaka. It was closed down in January 2010 following allegations of torture under a supervision of a government committee. The committee was led by Additional Secretary Md Ghulam Hussain of the Ministry of Home Affairs. Its members were Additional Inspector General Shah Jamal Raj, chief of Criminal Investigation Department, and Major General Md Mainul Islam, Director General of Bangladesh Rifles. During interrogation 67 mutineers died in custody. The bodies of some of the dead soldiers showed signs of torture.

References 

Organisations based in Dhaka
Government agencies of Bangladesh
Government-owned companies of Bangladesh
Bangladeshi intelligence agencies
Bangladesh Police